Andreas Karo (born 9 September 1996) is a Cypriot professional footballer who plays as a centre-back for Cypriot First Division club APOEL and the Cyprus national team.

Club career
On 12 July 2019, he signed with the Italian club Lazio. A week later, he was loaned to Serie B club Salernitana.

On 30 January 2021, he joined Portuguese club Marítimo.

On 9 June 2021, he left Marítimo for Cypriot club APOEL.

Career statistics

Club

Honours
Apollon Limassol
Cypriot Cup: 2016–17

References

External links

1996 births
Living people
Cypriot footballers
Association football defenders
Apollon Limassol FC players
Nea Salamis Famagusta FC players
U.S. Salernitana 1919 players
C.S. Marítimo players
APOEL FC players
Cypriot First Division players
Serie B players
Primeira Liga players
Sportspeople from Nicosia
Cyprus youth international footballers
Cyprus under-21 international footballers
Cyprus international footballers
Cypriot expatriate footballers
Expatriate footballers in Italy
Expatriate footballers in Portugal
Cypriot expatriate sportspeople in Italy
Cypriot expatriate sportspeople in Portugal